The 2016 UEFA Super Cup was the 41st edition of the UEFA Super Cup, an annual football match organised by UEFA and contested by the reigning champions of the two main European club competitions, the UEFA Champions League and the UEFA Europa League. The match featured Real Madrid, the winners of the 2015–16 UEFA Champions League, and Sevilla, the winners of the 2015–16 UEFA Europa League. It was a rematch of the 2014 UEFA Super Cup, which was won 2–0 by Real Madrid.

It was played at the Lerkendal Stadion in Trondheim, Norway, on 9 August 2016. Real Madrid won the match 3–2 after extra time for their third UEFA Super Cup title.

Venue

The Lerkendal Stadion was announced as the venue of the Super Cup at the UEFA Executive Committee meeting in Nyon, Switzerland, on 18 September 2014. It was the first UEFA final hosted in Norway.

The Lerkendal Stadion opened as a multi-purpose stadium on 10 August 1947, as the main football and athletics stadium in Trondheim. It is the home stadium of Rosenborg BK. The stadium has a capacity for 21,166 spectators, making it the second largest football stadium in Norway.

Teams

This was the third consecutive and fourth overall all-Spanish Super Cup.

Match

Summary
Real Madrid's starters of the 2016 Champions League Final Toni Kroos, Gareth Bale and Cristiano Ronaldo missed the match with injuries. In the 21st minute Marco Asensio scored the opening goal for Real Madrid with a strike from 25-yards out which flew into the top left corner of the net. Franco Vázquez got the equalizer in the 41st minute when he scored with a low left foot shot from just inside the penalty area.		
Sevilla were awarded a penalty in the 72nd minute when Sergio Ramos was adjudged to have fouled Vitolo by flicking back his leg inside the penalty area. Yevhen Konoplyanka scored from the resulting penalty with a low shot to his left sending the goalkeeper the wrong way. In the 93rd minute Sergio Ramos scored with a free header from two yards out after a cross from Lucas Vázquez on the right.		
Four minutes into extra-time Timothée Kolodziejczak was sent off for a second yellow card following a foul on Lucas Vázquez. Sergio Ramos then stooped low to score his second goal but the goal was ruled out for a pull on Sevilla defender Adil Rami.
In the 119th minute Dani Carvajal got into the penalty box after a long run down the right and scored when he lifted the ball with the outside of his right foot over the goalkeeper.

Details
The Champions League winners were designated as the "home" team for administrative purposes.

Statistics

See also
2014 UEFA Super Cup – contested between same teams
2016 UEFA Champions League Final
2016 UEFA Europa League Final
Real Madrid CF in international football competitions
Sevilla FC in European football
Spanish football clubs in international competitions

References

External links
2016 UEFA Super Cup, UEFA.com

2016
Super Cup
Uefa Super Cup 2016
Uefa Super Cup 2016
Super Cup
Sports competitions in Trondheim
August 2016 sports events in Europe
International club association football competitions hosted by Norway
Super Cup
21st century in Trondheim